Soviet submarine B-37 was a Project 641 or  diesel submarine of the Soviet Navy's Northern Fleet.

Service history
On 11 January 1962, the submarine was tied up at the pier in Ekaterininsky Bay of Polarny naval base, with all watertight doors open, while conducting maintenance and testing of her torpedoes. A fire broke out in the torpedo compartment, probably due to hydrogen gas igniting when electrical equipment was energized.  All eleven torpedoes cooked off.  The submarine was instantly destroyed with all hands except the commanding officer Captain Second Rank Begeba who was on the pier at the time of explosion, and Captain Third Rank Jakubenko, who was on another part of the sub base.

, a Project 633 or  submarine tied up next to B-37, was badly damaged by the explosion as well, and several men from other ships and the shipyard were killed.

In total, 122 people were killed: 59 B-37 crewmen, 19 S-350 crewmen, and 44 others.

References

External links

  buki 37

Foxtrot-class submarines
Ships built in the Soviet Union
1958 ships
Cold War submarines of the Soviet Union
Lost submarines of the Soviet Union
Maritime incidents in 1962